Waubay National Wildlife Refuge is a National Wildlife Refuge in South Dakota.  "Waubay" means "a place where numbers of birds make their nests" in the Dakota language. The Refuge encompasses  of wetlands, native tallgrass prairie, and bur oak forest that provide a wide variety of nesting habitat for more than 100 species of waterfowl, song birds, and upland game birds as well as 140 additional bird species during migrations. Mammals include species from the ever-present white-tailed deer to the more elusive coyote and the diminutive pygmy shrew. The central location of Waubay National Wildlife Refuge in North America gives visitors the chance to see a mix of eastern, western, northern, and southern species.

References
Refuge website

National Wildlife Refuges in South Dakota
Protected areas of Day County, South Dakota
Wetlands of South Dakota
Landforms of Day County, South Dakota
1935 establishments in South Dakota
Protected areas established in 1935